"Oh What It Did to Me" is a song written by Jerry Crutchfield, and recorded by American country music artist Tanya Tucker.  It was released in February 1991 as the fourth single from her album Tennessee Woman.  The song reached number 12 on the Billboard Hot Country Singles & Tracks chart in June 1991.

Chart performance

References

1991 singles
1990 songs
Tanya Tucker songs
Capitol Records Nashville singles
Songs written by Jerry Crutchfield
Song recordings produced by Jerry Crutchfield